The 2017 Maine Black Bears football team represented the University of Maine in the 2017 NCAA Division I FCS football season. They were led by second-year head coach Joe Harasymiak and played their home games at Alfond Stadium. They were a member of the Colonial Athletic Association. Maine initially had a game scheduled on September 30 against Central Florida but that game was canceled on September 14 in the aftermath of Hurricane Irma. They finished the season 4–6, 3–5 in CAA play to finish in a three-way tie for seventh place.

Schedule

 Source:

Game summaries

at New Hampshire

Bryant

at James Madison

at Villanova

Rhode Island

at Albany

William & Mary

Delaware

at UMass

Stony Brook

References

Maine
Maine Black Bears football seasons
Maine Black Bears football